The Confederate Soldiers and Sailors Monument was a monument in Baltimore, Maryland, installed in 1903 and removed in 2017.

Description and history
The Maryland Daughters of the Confederacy raised money for the monument privately and commissioned a sculptor from New York City, F. Wellington Ruckstuhl to build it. The monument was dedicated on May 2, 1903.

 

The statue shows Glory supporting a fallen soldier, his standard lowered but her wreath of History held high. The inscription at the base of the monument read, "GLORIA VICTIS", meaning "Glory to the Vanquished" and To The Soldiers and Sailors of Maryland in the Service of The Confederate States of America, 1861–1865. On the right side it read: "Deo vindice", on the left: "Fatti maschii, parole femine" and on the rear Glory Stands Beside Our Grief. Erected by the Maryland Daughters of the Confederacy, February 1903. 

The monument was marked in June 2015, with "black lives matter" scrawled across its side in the aftermath of the Charleston church shooting. In August 2017, its statue was covered with red paint. It was removed during the same month along with all other Confederate monuments in the city after the Baltimore City Council unanimously voted on August 14, 2017, to have it removed along with the Stonewall Jackson and Robert E. Lee Monument, the Roger B. Taney Sculpture, and the Confederate Women's Monument.

See also
 List of Confederate monuments and memorials
 List of public art in Baltimore
 Removal of Confederate monuments and memorials

References

External links
 
  

1903 establishments in Maryland
1903 sculptures
2017 disestablishments in Maryland
Allegorical sculptures in the United States
Confederate States of America monuments and memorials in Maryland
Relocated buildings and structures in Maryland
Removed Confederate States of America monuments and memorials
Sculptures of men in Maryland
Sculptures of women in Maryland
Statues in Maryland
Outdoor sculptures in Baltimore
Vandalized works of art in Maryland